The Bishop of Manchester is the ordinary of the Church of England Diocese of Manchester in the Province of York.

The current bishop is David Walker who was enthroned on 30 November 2013.  The bishop's official residence is Bishopscourt, Broughton, Salford.

History
The Diocese of Manchester was founded in 1847. With the growth of the population in and around Manchester, the bishop appointed the first suffragan bishop, the Bishop of Hulme, in 1924 to assist in overseeing the diocese. Three years later a second was appointed, the Bishop of Middleton. After nearly sixty years, the third and final suffragan bishop, the Bishop of Bolton, was appointed in 1984.

List of bishops

Assistant bishops
Among those who have served as assistant bishops of the diocese are:
18871901 (d.): Francis Cramer-Roberts, Vicar of Blackburn, Archdeacon of Blackburn (1900 onwards) and former Bishop of Nassau

References

External links
 Crockford's Clerical Directory - Listings

Manchester
 
Bishop of Manchester